HMS Carlotta has been the name of two brigs of the British Royal Navy, and may refer to:

 HMS Carlotta, was the  launched in 1807 that  captured in 1810, and that was wrecked in 1812.
 , was the brig Pylades, probably captured in 1812, and renamed Carlotta after the wreck of her predecessor, and broken up in 1815.

Royal Navy ship names